Pleven is the seventh most populous city in Bulgaria. Located in the northern part of the country, it is the administrative centre of Pleven Province, as well as of the subordinate Pleven municipality. It is the biggest economic center in Northwestern Bulgaria. At the 2021 census its population was 89,823.

Internationally known for the siege of Plevna of 1877, it is today a major economic centre of the Bulgarian Northwest and Central North and the third largest city of Northern Bulgaria after Varna and Ruse.

Name
The name comes from the Slavic word plevnya ("barn") or from plevel, meaning "weed", sharing the same root, and the Slavic suffix -en.

Geography

Pleven is in an agricultural region in the middle of the Danubian Plain, the historical region of Moesia, surrounded by low limestone hills, the Pleven Heights. The city's central location in Northern Bulgaria defines its importance as a big administrative, economic, political, cultural and transport centre.

The river Vit flows near the city and the tiny Tuchenitsa river (commonly known in Pleven as Barata, literally "The Streamlet") crosses it.

Climate
Pleven's climate is humid continental. Winters are cold with snow: temperatures can fall below  overnight. Summers are warm, and temperatures have exceeded  on occasion.

History

Prehistory and antiquity
The earliest traces of human settlement in the area date from the 5th millennium BC, the Neolithic.

Numerous archaeological findings, among them the Nikolaevo treasure found in Bulgaria, evidence for the rich culture of the Thracians, who inhabited the area for thousands of years.

In the beginning of the new era, the region became part of the Roman province of Moesia, and a road station called Storgosia arose near present-day Pleven on the road from Oescus (near modern Gigen) to Philippopolis (now Plovdiv). It later evolved into a fortress. One of the most valued archaeological monuments in Bulgaria from the period is the Early Christian basilica from the fourth century discovered near the modern city.

Middle Ages

During the Middle Ages, Pleven was a well-developed stronghold of the First and the Second Bulgarian Empire. When Slavs populated the region, they gave the settlement its contemporary name Pleven, it was first mentioned in a charter by Hungarian king Stephen V in 1270 in connection to a military campaign in the Bulgarian lands.

Ottoman rule
During the Ottoman rule, Pleven, known as Plevne in Ottoman Turkish, preserved its Bulgarian appearance and culture. Many churches, schools and bridges were built at the time of the Bulgarian National Revival. In 1825, the first secular school in the town was opened, followed by the first girls' school in Bulgaria in 1840, as well as the first boys' school a year later. Pleven was the place where the Bulgarian national hero Vasil Levski established the first revolutionary committee in 1869, part of his national revolutionary network.

Siege of Plevna

The city (then mostly known as Plevna outside Bulgaria) was a major battle scene during the Russo-Turkish War of 1877–1878 that Russian Tsar Alexander II held for the purpose of the liberation of Bulgaria. The joint Russian and Romanian army paid dearly for the victory, but it paved the path to the defeat of the Ottoman Empire in this war, the restoration of Bulgaria as a state and the independence of Romania from the Ottoman Empire. It cost the Russians and Romanians 5 months and 38,000 casualties to take the town after four assaults, in what was one of the decisive battles of the war. The siege is remembered as a landmark victory of the Romanian War of Independence, as on 28 November 1877 the Plevna citadel capitulated, and Osman Pasha surrendered the city, the garrison and his sword to the Romanian Colonel Mihail Cerchez.

In the Encyclopædia Britannica Eleventh Edition of 1911 J.H.V. Crowe concluded his lengthy entry on Pleven (transcribed as Plevna) with the memorable dictum:

On the other hand, the siege of Plevna stands out among other countless sieges and military actions in the region because of its significance.

Modern history
The events of the Russo-Turkish War proved crucial for the development of Pleven as a key town of central northern Bulgaria. The town experienced significant demographic and economic growth in the following years, gradually establishing itself as a cultural centre of the region.

The Bulgarian Agrarian National Union, a leading interwar party representing the Bulgarian peasantry, was founded in the town in December 1899.

Prior to the Bulgarian orthographic reform of 1945, the name of the town was spelled Плѣвенъ (with yat) in Cyrillic.

Population

According to census 2021, Pleven has a population of 89,823 inhabitants as of December 2021. The ethnic breakdown is 97% Bulgarians among others. The number of the residents of the city reached its peak in the period 1988-1991 when exceeded 135,000. The following table presents the change of the population after 1887.

Ethnic, linguistic and religious composition

According to the 2011 census data, the individuals declared their ethnic identity were distributed as follows:
Bulgarians: 95,386 (96.5%)
Turks: 1,510 (1.5%)
Gypsies: 1,017 (1.0%)
Others: 489 (0.5%)
Indefinable: 422 (0.4%)
Undeclared: 8,130 (7.6%)
Total: 106,954

In Pleven Municipality 112,414 declared as Bulgarians, 4626 as Gypsies, 3204 as Turks and 10,384 did not declare their ethnic group. Most Roma people in Pleven Municipality live in the village of Bukovlak (:bg:Буковлък).

An overwhelming majority of 90% of Pleven's residents are Eastern Orthodox Christian. The Diocese of Nikopol, of which Pleven is part, is one of the two Roman Catholic dioceses in Bulgaria, and another 5% of the residents are Roman Catholic by faith, a significant number compared to other Bulgarian cities.

The construction of a large Roman Catholic church of Our Lady of Fatima began in 2001. A mosque also exists in the town to serve the needs of the Muslim population, as well as a Methodist church that is situated on the site of the former local puppet theatre.

Economy

A major centre of oil processing, metalworking, machinery construction, of light and food industries in Socialist times. However, the late 1990s and early 2000s saw a revival of light industry  and the development of branches such as knitwear and store clothes production. Tourism, which had attracted many people from the Soviet Union prior to 1989, and had experienced a slump in the following years, is on the rise again. 

In 2015, the unemployment rate in Pleven district was 9.2%.

The most important economic sectors in Pleven are chemical, textiles and foodstuffs industries, the manufacturing of cement and glass, machine building, tailoring, agriculture, retail and services.
The city has seen a number of major foreign investments in the late 1990s and early 2000s. Particularly noticeable is the mass construction of hypermarkets, with two Billa, two Kaufland, two Carrefour (in construction- first one to open in MALL PLEVEN in 2011), DM, Plus (in construction), ELEMAG, METRO, two LIDL stores, a Praktiker, bauMax and a number of other hypermarkets being opened . The Pleven City Center and Central Mall Pleven were opened in 2008.

Transport
The international railway Sofia — Bucharest — Moscow runs through Pleven. The international road E 83 passes just north of the city.

Over 90% of the inner city transportation in Pleven is maintained by trolleybuses. There are 14 trolleybus lines, and  trolleybus network. The trolleybus fleet consist of ZIU-682 (1985–1988) and Skoda 26-TR Solaris trolleybuses, produced in 2014. A project for  trolleybus routes extension is underway. When the extension is completed Pleven will become 100% covered by trolleybus transport.

Transmitter
Near Pleven, there is a large facility for medium wave and short wave broadcasting. These masts belong to the tallest structures of Bulgaria.

Main sights
Most of the sights of the town are related to the Russo-Turkish War. The monuments related to the war alone are about 200. Some of the more popular include the St George the Conqueror Chapel Mausoleum in honour of the many Russian and Romanian soldiers who lost their lives during the siege of Plevna and the ossuary in Skobelev Park. Another popular attraction is Pleven Panorama, created after (and reputedly larger than) the Borodino Panorama in Russia on the occasion of the anniversary of the siege of Plevna.

Culture
The Pleven Regional Historical Museum is another popular tourist attraction, while the Svetlin Rusev Donative Exhibition, situated in the former public baths, exhibits works by Bulgarian artists, as well as noted Western European art figures.

The Ivan Radoev Dramatic Theatre is the centre of theatrical life in Pleven. A number of community centres (chitalishta) are also active in the city.

Medical University - Pleven, one of the five medical universities in Bulgaria, was established in 1974, aiming to expand the horizons, size and reputation of the City Hospital, founded in 1865.

Sport and recreation
Pleven is often regarded  as an important centre of sports in Bulgaria, with many noted Bulgarian sportspeople having been born and/or trained in the town, including Tereza Marinova and Galabin Boevski.

The city hosts two football clubs, Spartak Pleven and Belite orli, which have separate stadiums. Both teams play in the second Bulgarian league and haven't had any major successes in the past, although Spartak Pleven has been the first team for a couple of former Bulgarian internationals such as Plamen Getov.

Spartak Pleven is also a basketball team, a national championship winner in 1995 and national cup winner in 1996 (then named Plama Pleven). Other than that, the team is a regular first league participant.

Pleven is famous for its Kaylaka (where the ruins of the Storgosia fortification can be found) and Skobelev parks. The latter is home to the Pleven Panorama and is situated on the original location of the battle during the Russo-Turkish War.

Notable people
Ilia Beshkov, artist
Detelin Dalakliev, boxer
Dora Deliyska, classical pianist
Lucy Diakovska, singer
Emil Dimitrov, singer and composer
Ghena Dimitrova, operatic soprano
Silvia Dimitrova, artist
Dionisii Donchev, artist
Tereza Marinova, triple jump athlete, 2000 Summer Olympics gold medallist
Svetlin Rusev, artist
Slavi Trifonov, popular showman politician 
Svetla Vassileva, publicist and blogger

International relations

Twin towns – sister cities
Pleven is twinned with:

 Agadir, Morocco
 Brăila, Romania
 Bitola, North Macedonia
 Bursa, Turkey
 Central Administrative Okrug (Moscow), Russia
 Charlottesville, United States
 Chernivtsi, Ukraine
 Edessa, Greece
 Gornji Milanovac, Serbia
 Jinzhou, China
 Kaiserslautern, Germany
 Kavadarci, North Macedonia
 Ponta Delgada, Portugal
 Płock, Poland
 Rostov-on-Don, Russia
 Segovia, Spain
 Volos, Greece
 Yangquan, China

Honours
 A city in Kansas and a town in Montana in the United States, as well as a village in Ontario, Canada were named after Pleven, or more precisely its historical name in English Plevna, the reason for which is the battle in 1877.
 A road in Hampton, Middlesex, London is named Plevna, adjoining another called Varna Road both made up of Victorian terraced housing built in the 1870s and named after the battles in Bulgaria of the period.
 Pleven Saddle on Livingston Island in the South Shetland Islands, Antarctica is named after Pleven.
 In other countries there are five cities and towns named after Plevna, and eighteen Plevna streets in Britain alone
 In Romania, more than 10 large cities have a Plevna (Romanian for "Pleven") street, as Pleven was the location for an important battle between the Ottoman Empire on one side, and the Russian Empire and Romania on the other, after which Romania gained independence.

Gallery

See also
List of cities and towns in Bulgaria
Plama Pleven
Dr. Georgi Stranski University Hospital

References

Sources

External links

Municipality of Pleven

 
Populated places in Pleven Province